Tayler Wiles (born July 20, 1989) is an American racing cyclist, who currently rides for UCI Women's WorldTeam . She rode at the 2014 UCI Road World Championships. Wiles originally played soccer until she entered the University of Utah as a pre-medical student at the age of 18. She subsequently took up cycling with her then boyfriend during her sophomore year in 2008.

Personal life
Wiles is openly gay. She is married to former professional cyclist Olivia Dillon.

Major results

2012
 3rd Overall Tour Cycliste Féminin International de l'Ardèche
2013
 1st Stage 1 (TTT) Belgium Tour
 National Road Championships
8th Time trial
9th Road race
2014
 1st Overall Rás na mBan
 1st Chrono Gatineau
 2nd Overall Tour Cycliste Féminin International de l'Ardèche
 National Road Championships
4th Road race
4th Time trial
2015
 1st  Overall Women's Tour of New Zealand
1st Stages 1 (TTT) & 4
 1st  Overall Tour Cycliste Féminin International de l'Ardèche
1st  Points classification
1st Stage 3
 1st Stage 2a (TTT) Energiewacht Tour
 National Road Championships
3rd Road race
9th Time trial
 3rd Chrono Gatineau
 5th Amgen Tour of California Women's Invitational Time Trial
 8th Winston-Salem Cycling Classic
 10th Time trial, EPZ Omloop van Borsele
2016
 2nd Overall La Route de France
 4th Overall Tour de Feminin-O cenu Českého Švýcarska
 7th Time trial, National Road Championships
 7th Chrono Gatineau
 7th Winston-Salem Cycling Classic
 7th Cadel Evans Great Ocean Road Race
2017
 1st  Overall Tour of the Gila
 2nd  Time trial, Pan American Road Championships
 2nd Overall Tour de Feminin-O cenu Českého Švýcarska
1st  Mountains classification
 4th Chrono Gatineau
 5th Time trial, National Road Championships
 5th Overall Thüringen Rundfahrt der Frauen
1st  Mountains classification
1st Stage 5
 Active rider classification, Stage 2
 8th Overall Joe Martin Stage Race
2018
 2nd Time trial, National Road Championships
 2nd Overall Tour of California
 3rd Chrono Gatineau
 4th Overall Holland Ladies Tour
 10th Time trial, UCI Road World Championships
 10th Overall Thüringen Rundfahrt der Frauen
2019
 1st Postnord UCI WWT Vårgårda West Sweden TTT
 3rd Chrono Gatineau
 4th Overall Emakumeen Bira
1st Stage 3
2020
 1st Stage 1 (TTT) Giro Rosa
 3rd Race Torquay
 4th Cadel Evans Great Ocean Road Race
2021
 1st Stage 1 (TTT) Giro Rosa

See also
2013 Specialized–lululemon season
2014 Specialized–lululemon season

References

External links
 
 

1989 births
Living people
American female cyclists
Place of birth missing (living people)
LGBT cyclists
21st-century American women
Cyclists from Utah
University of Utah alumni